Xia County or Xiaxian is a county in the southwest of Shanxi province, People's Republic of China, bordering Henan province to the southeast. It is under the jurisdiction of Yuncheng City.

History
In ancient China, it served as the previous capitals of the Xia Dynasty and the Wei kingdom, and was previously known as Mingtiao. It was the site of the Battle of Mingtiao, which took place in about 1600 BCE.

A notable site in the county is Sima Wengong Temple (司馬溫公祠), the family home and burial place of Sima Guang, a Song Dynasty historian.

Climate

See also
List of administrative divisions of Shanxi

References

County-level divisions of Shanxi